Cheritra is the genus of "typical" imperials, butterflies in the family Lycaenidae.
The species of this genus are found in the Indomalayan realm.

Species
Cheritra aenea Semper, 1890 Philippines
Cheritra aenigma Cowan, 1967 Sumatra
Cheritra freja (Fabricius, 1793) – common imperial
Cheritra orpheus (C. & R. Felder, 1862)
Cheritra pallida (Druce, 1873) Borneo

External links
Cheritra at Markku Savela's Lepidoptera and Some Other Life Forms
Images representing Cheritra, at Consortium for the Barcode of Life

 
Lycaenidae genera
Taxa named by Frederic Moore